Karak or Kork or Kark in Iran may refer to:

 Karak, Hamadan, village in Hamadan Province
 Kork, Kerman, village in Kerman Province
 Korak, Semnan, village in Semnan Province
 Karak-e Inkacheh, village in Tehran Province
 Simun, Iran, aka Karak, village in Tehran Province